In This World is a 2002 British docudrama directed by Michael Winterbottom.

In This World may refer to:
 "In This World" (song), a 2002 song by Moby
 In This World (Cindytalk album), 1988
 In This World (Mark Turner album), 1998